Gallina is a surname. Notable people with the surname include:

Antonio Gallina (born 1947), Argentine judoka
Ernesto Gallina (1924–2002), Italian Roman Catholic prelate
Gerardo Lagunes Gallina (born 1975), Mexican politician
Giada Gallina (born 1973), Italian sprinter
Giovanni Gallina (1892–1963), Italian footballer
Mario Gallina (1889–1950), Italian actor
Paolo Gallina, Canadian politician
Pedro Alfredo Gallina, Argentine footballer 
Roberto Gallina (born 1940), Italian Grand Prix motorcycle road racer and racing team owner